Miroslav Todić (born 6 January 1985) is a Bosnian professional basketball player who last played for S.L. Benfica of the Portuguese basketball League.

Professional career
Todić played in several European leagues first in Slovenia, then Germany from 2004 to 2007 for Skyliners Frankfurt, then he moved to Greece in Kolossus where he remained for two seasons.

In 2009 Miroslav joined Olympia Larissa, where he remained just until mid-season and moved to Sweden to join Sundsvall Dragons. In 2010-2012 he played for the Cypriot top division team Achilleas, and in November he was again  back in Greece with Ilysiakos.

In 2011–12 he played for Politekhnika-Halychyna in Ukrainian SuperLeague. After that he came for the first time to Italy for the season 2012-2013 and played with Fulgor Libertas Forlì in the Championship of Legadue. However, at the beginning of 2013 he moved to Ukraine again, this time to Khimik. In the summer of 2013 he was back to Italy, and signed a one-year deal with Enel Brindisi team which features in the highest Italian league.

In July 2014, he signed with Dinamo Sassari. On 18 January 2015, he left the Italian team. On the next day, he signed with Tofaş.
In August 2015, he signed with Champagne Reims Basket in France championship Pro A.

On December 7, 2016, Todic joined Promitheas Patras.

References

External links
 FIBA.com Profile 
 Eurobasket.com Profile
 Euroleague.net Profile
 New Basket Brindisi Profile

1985 births
Living people
Achilleas Kaimakli players
BC Khimik players
BC Politekhnika-Halychyna players
Bosnia and Herzegovina men's basketball players
CS Universitatea Cluj-Napoca (men's basketball) players
Dinamo Sassari players
Fulgor Libertas Forlì players
Ilysiakos B.C. players
KK Krka players
KK Olimpija players
Kolossos Rodou B.C. players
New Basket Brindisi players
Olympia Larissa B.C. players
Promitheas Patras B.C. players
Reims Champagne Basket players
S.L. Benfica basketball players
Serbian expatriate basketball people in Cyprus
Serbian expatriate basketball people in Germany
Serbian expatriate basketball people in Greece
Serbian expatriate basketball people in France
Serbian expatriate basketball people in Italy
Serbian expatriate basketball people in Portugal
Serbian expatriate basketball people in Romania
Serbian expatriate basketball people in Slovenia
Serbian expatriate basketball people in Sweden
Serbian expatriate basketball people in Turkey
Serbian expatriate basketball people in Ukraine
Serbian expatriate basketball people in Qatar
Serbs of Bosnia and Herzegovina
Skyliners Frankfurt players
Sportspeople from Tuzla
Sundsvall Dragons players
Tofaş S.K. players
Centers (basketball)
Power forwards (basketball)